Bukit Naning is a main town in Muar District, Johor, Malaysia. It is situated in the parliamentary constituency of Bakri.

References

Towns in Johor
Muar District